Sterolibacterium denitrificans is a gram-negative, rod-shaped motile bacterium with a single polar flagellum from the genus of Rhodocyclus.

References

External links
Type strain of Sterolibacterium denitrificans at BacDive -  the Bacterial Diversity Metadatabase

Rhodocyclaceae
Bacteria described in 2003